Jerusalem is an EP by British singer Mark Stewart, released in 1982 through On-U Sound Records.

Accolades

Track listing

Personnel 
Musicians
The Maffia
Desmond "Fatfingers" Coke – keyboards
Charles "Eskimo" Fox – drums
Evar Wellington – bass guitar
Mark Stewart – vocals, art direction
Additional musicians and production
George Oban – bass guitar on "Liberty City" and "Jerusalem"
Nick Plytas – keyboards on "Liberty City"
Adrian Sherwood – production

References 

1982 debut EPs
On-U Sound Records EPs
Mark Stewart (English musician) albums
albums produced by Adrian Sherwood
Musical settings of poems by William Blake